Destot is a French surname. Notable people with the surname include:

 Étienne Destot (1864–1918), French radiologist and anatomist
 Michel Destot (born 1946), French politician

See also
 Destot's sign
 Destot's space

French-language surnames